Steven Maher (born November 29, 1962) is an American luger. He competed in the men's doubles event at the 1988 Winter Olympics.

References

External links
 

1962 births
Living people
American male lugers
Olympic lugers of the United States
Lugers at the 1988 Winter Olympics
Sportspeople from Evanston, Illinois